Action (formerly Action Food Barns and Action Supermarkets) was an Australian supermarket chain.

Based in Perth, Action had 80 supermarkets across Western Australia, Queensland and New South Wales, and was one of the largest supermarket chains in Australia. Action Supermarkets Head Office was located at 218 Bannister Road Canning Vale WA 6155, Action's Fresh Produce Centre was located at 24 Walters Drive Osborne Park and Meat Centre at Pavers Circle Malaga.

FAL - Foodland Associated Limited
Foodland Associated Limited is one of Australia's largest public companies and conducts operations in Western Australia, Queensland, northern New South Wales and the North and South Islands of New Zealand.

The Group's core businesses are supermarket retailing and grocery wholesaling. FAL has five operating divisions with combined annual sales exceeding $5 billion, providing employment to over 28,000 staff throughout Australia and New Zealand.

Australia
FAL's Action supermarket chain trades through 43 stores in the Queensland and northern New South Wales and 38 stores in Western Australia.

FAL Wholesale supplies all of Western Australia's independent supermarket operators and co-ordinates the Dewsons, Supa Valu, Foodland and 4 Square banner franchise groups. FAL's FoodLink food service division supplies hotels, restaurants, cafes, institutions, schools and fast food outlets throughout Western Australia. The company also operates three Cash & Carry wholesale grocery warehouses.

New Zealand
Progressive Enterprises now operates 148 supermarkets trading under the Countdown, Foodtown and Woolworths banners and 26 Woolworths at Gull micromarkets and convenience stores. Progressive is also the franchise co-ordinator for the FreshChoice and SuperValue franchise banner groups.

Trading
Its generic brand range was called "Basics" and its corporate generic brand range was the "Signature Range". Action's last slogan was "Action means a great deal". Previous slogans included "Packed Full of Great Shopping Ideas" and "Packed Full of Good Taste".

Action served in excess of 750,000 customers every week and employed over 7,800 staff. Total supermarket trading area at the end of the November 2003 was approximately 159,000 square metres. Action still holds the largest trading floor area at Whitfords (Hillarys 4,500m) and Innaloo 5,200m.

Action's first supermarkets were located in Dianella, Dogswamp (Yokine), Morley, Woodlands and Osborne Park. Innaloo still holds the largest trading area in the southern hemisphere.

Demise
Action was originally operated exclusively in Western Australia (WA) by Foodland Associated Limited, which was New Zealand's largest supermarket company and also operated the Supa Valu, Dewsons and Dewsons Express supermarkets in WA.

FAL website before takeover https://web.archive.org/web/20050615131210/http://www.fal.com.au/fal/home.jsp?ident=HOME

In 2001, Action had expanded into Queensland and northern NSW by purchasing 40 Franklins stores and associated distribution centres.

FAL was later sold to rivals Metcash (Australian licensee of the international IGA brand) and Woolworths in late 2005.

In March 2006, Metcash announced that it would convert its remaining Action-branded supermarkets into IGA-branded stores. By October 2007, the last of the stores had been converted or sold.

References

Defunct supermarkets of Australia
Australian companies established in 1970
Retail companies established in 1970
Retail companies disestablished in 2007
2007 disestablishments in Australia
Australian grocers